

History
On 3 September 2017, Premier Lin Chuan tendered his resignation to President Tsai Ing-wen, which was reluctantly accepted. A recent poll showed Lin's approve rating to be a mere 28.7%, with 6 in 10 respondents dissatisfied with the performance of his cabinet. On 5 September President Tsai announced at a press conference that Lai would become the country's next head of the Executive Yuan, with the Premier-designate saying that running the government is like running in a relay race, and he vowed to take the baton from Lin and complete his unfinished major policies.

Lai took office on 8 September as the 49th Premier of the Republic of China. On 17 September following Lai's appointment as premier, Tsai's approval ratings reached 46%, rebounding by more than 16 points since August. Lai made his first appearance as premier at the Legislative Yuan on 26 September, where he stated "I am a political worker who advocates Taiwan independence" but that "We are already an independent sovereign nation called the Republic of China. We don't need a separate declaration of independence". Lai has appeared to have moderated his position on Taiwanese independence particularly when he proposed the idea of "being close to China while loving Taiwan" in June 2017. He also expressed no desire to run against Tsai Ing-wen in the 2020 presidential election. On 28 September the New Party called on the KMT to join it in filing a formal complaint against the Premier for sedition.

Lai's cabinet resigned on 11 January 2019. His cabinet was succeeded by the second cabinet of Su Tseng-chang.

Members

Leaders

Ministries

Councils and Commissions 
Empowered by various laws, or even the Constitution, under the Executive Yuan Council several individual boards are formed to enforce different executive functions of the government. Unless regulated otherwise, the chairs are appointed by and answer to the Premier. The committee members of the boards are usually (a) governmental officials for the purpose of interdepartmental coordination and cooperation; or (b) creditable professionals for their reputation and independence.

Independent Commissions 
There are, or would be, independent executive commissions under the Executive Yuan Council. The chiefs of these five institutions would not be affected by any change of the Premier. However, the related organic laws are currently under revision.

Other organs

References

Executive Yuan